Custard cake can refer to

Flan cake, a Filipino dessert made with chiffon or sponge cake topped with a layer of crème caramel
Flancocho, a Puerto Rican dessert made with a sponge cake topped with a layer of crème caramel and cream cheese
Mille-feuille or custard slice, a French pastry with alternating layers of pastry cream and puff pastry
Yema cake, a Filipino chiffon cake with a custard filling
An old name for Boston cream pie

See also
List of custard desserts